Li Xiaoyong (born 28 November 1969) is a Chinese former basketball player who competed in the 1996 Summer Olympics and in the 2000 Summer Olympics.

References

1969 births
Living people
Basketball players from Liaoning
Chinese men's basketball players
Olympic basketball players of China
Basketball players at the 1996 Summer Olympics
Basketball players at the 2000 Summer Olympics
Asian Games medalists in basketball
Asian Games gold medalists for China
Basketball players at the 1998 Asian Games
Liaoning Flying Leopards players
Medalists at the 1998 Asian Games